Matinée is the French word for morning. In the arts, a matinée is a performance or exhibition that takes place in the daytime.

Matinée may also refer to:

Matinée (album), an album by Jack Peñate
Matinee (1993 film), an American period film by Joe Dante
Matinee (2012 film), an Indian film by Aneesh Upasana
"The Dark of the Matinée", also known as "Matinée", a song by Franz Ferdinand
Matinée (disco), South American alcohol-free discothèque for teenagers
 Matinee, a machinima production software tool

See also
Matinée idol